Alpine skiing is an Olympic sport, contested at the Winter Olympic Games. The first Winter Olympics, held in 1924, included nordic skiing, but the first alpine skiing events were not held until 1936 in Garmisch-Partenkirchen, Germany. A combined event was held for both men and women in 1936. The International Ski Federation (FIS) decided that ski instructors could not compete in 1936 because they were professionals, and the Olympics were meant for amateur athletes. Because of this, Austrian and Swiss skiers boycotted the events, although some Austrians decided to compete for Germany.

Summary
Due to World War II, no games were held in 1940 or 1944. Two new alpine events were added in 1948: downhill and slalom. Combined events were also held in 1948, but were dropped after that and not contested again at the Olympics until 1988. The giant slalom debuted at the Olympics in 1952 and the Olympic program was three events for both men and women through 1984.

Since 1988, events for both men and women have been held in five disciplines: downhill, slalom, giant slalom, super-G (since 1988), and combined. From 1948 to 1980, the Winter Olympics also served as the World Championships in Olympic years (with separate competitions held in even-numbered non-Olympic years). Since 1985, the World Championships have been scheduled  every odd-numbered year, independent of the Winter Olympics.

Kjetil André Aamodt of Norway is the most-decorated Olympic alpine skier with eight medals (four gold, two silver, two bronze). He was the oldest gold medalist (age 34 in 2006) in Olympic alpine skiing, until passed by several months in 2014 by Mario Matt, also 34. Austrian Traudl Hecher remains the youngest medalist in Olympic alpine skiing; she won bronze in the downhill at age 16 in 1960. Michela Figini of Switzerland is the youngest champion in Olympic alpine skiing history, with a gold medal in downhill at age 17 in 1984. Two Americans set age records in 2014: Mikaela Shiffrin, age 18, became the youngest Olympic slalom champion and Bode Miller became the oldest medalist in Olympic alpine skiing, with a bronze in the super-G at age 36. Croatian Janica Kostelić has won the most medals of any woman, with six (four gold, two silver). In 1952, American Andrea Mead Lawrence became the first female alpine skier to win two gold medals; Henri Oreiller of France won two golds and a bronze in 1948. Alberto Tomba of Italy was the first to successfully defend an Olympic alpine title, in giant slalom in 1992. Five others have since repeated, Aamodt in super-G in 2006, his third win in the event, and four women: Katja Seizinger, Deborah Compagnoni, Kostelić, and Maria Höfl-Riesch.

At the 1956 Games, Austrian Toni Sailer became the first to win gold in all of the available events; the feat was later repeated by France's Jean-Claude Killy in 1968. Sailer, age 20 in 1956, remains the youngest male gold medalist and was the youngest male medalist until 2014, when Henrik Kristoffersen of Norway took bronze in the slalom at age 19.

Austrians have won a combined 121 medals, including 37 golds, more than any other nation. At least one Austrian has won a medal every year, except in 1936, in which Austrian men did not compete. A total of 154 gold medals, 155 silver medals and 152 bronze medals have been awarded since 1936 and have been won by alpine racers from 25 National Olympic Committees (NOC).

Men
The numbers in brackets denotes alpine skiers who won gold medals in corresponding disciplines for more than one time. Bold numbers denotes record number of victories in certain disciplines.

Downhill

Super-G

Giant slalom

Slalom

Combined

Women
The numbers in brackets denotes alpine skiers who won gold medals in corresponding disciplines for more than one time. Bold numbers denotes record number of victories in certain disciplines.

Downhill

Super-G

Giant slalom

Slalom

Combined

Mixed

Team

Statistics

Medal table

Alpine skier medal leaders

Men

Women

* denotes all Olympics in which mentioned alpine skiers took part. Boldface denotes latest Olympics.

Alpine skiers with most victories

Top 10 alpine skiers who won more gold medals at the Winter Olympics are listed below. Boldface denotes active alpine skiers and highest medal count among all alpine skiers (including these who not included in these tables) per type.

Men

Women

* denotes only those Olympics at which mentioned alpine skiers won at least one medal

Medal sweep events
These are events where athletes from one nation won all three medals.

See also
 List of Paralympic medalists in alpine skiing
 List of alpine skiing world champions
 Lists of Olympic medalists

References
General
 
 
 
  
 
 
 
 
 
 
 
 
 
 
 
 
  
 
 
 
 

Specific

External links
 Sports Reference  – Winter Olympics –  Alpine skiing
 Olympic Review and Revue Olympique. LA84 Foundation

Alpine skiing
medalists
 
Olympic
Olympic